Altin Rraklli (born 17 July 1970) is an Albanian football coach and former player who played as a forward.

Most of his professional career was spent in Germany, where he played for five clubs in both major levels of football, mainly SC Freiburg and SpVgg Unterhaching for a total of 282 games. He was the first ever player from the nation to compete in the Bundesliga.

Club career
Born in Kavajë, Rraklli began his career with Besa Kavajë, moving to the professionals three years later. In 1992 he signed a two-year contract worth 15,000 Deutsche Mark with Germany's SC Freiburg, being instrumental in the Black Forest club's first ever top flight promotion by scoring 16 second division goals (squad best, tenth in the league, as Freiburg scored 102); in the next three Bundesliga seasons, he would only manage to be relatively used.

In the following eight years, Rraklli continued to work in Germany, mainly in the second level: Hertha BSC, SpVgg Unterhaching – achieving another promotion and living his best professional years – and SSV Jahn Regensburg, also having one-season spells in Turkey and his homeland and retiring professionally in 2006 with German top flight totals of 111 matches and 16 goals.

Rraklli returned in Albania in the summer of 2004, joining Tirana. He scored 19 league goals in his first season back in Albania, more than any other Tirana player, helping the team to win the championship. One of the highlights of the season was a hat-trick he scored against Teuta Durrës on 6 May 2005. On 21 August 2005, he played in the 2005 Albanian Supercup against Teuta Durrës which ended in a 5–4 penalty shootout win; Rraklli scored his team's last attempt.

Rraklli retired for good in 2009 at 39 years of age, after a brief spell with German amateurs SpVgg Bayern Hof.

International career
Rraklli was a member of Albania national team from 1992 to 2005, amassing 63 appearances and scoring 11 goals. His debut was a memorable one, as he scored the only goal of a friendly match against Greece on 29 January 1992, to give Albania only their second ever win versus Ethniki. Shortly after, Rraklli was a member of the squad in the qualifying campaign of 1994 FIFA World Cup, making his competitive debut, in his second ever appearance, in a 2–0 defeat to Republic of Ireland in Dublin on 26 May. He went on to play six matches in the remaining part of the qualifiers, scoring only once, a late consolation goal in the home loss to Northern Ireland, which was his first competitive goal as well. It was a campaign to forget for Albania as they finished Group 3 in the last position, collecting only four points in 12 matches.

Rraklli partnered Sokol Kushta in the UEFA Euro 1996 qualifying campaign, where Albania was placed in Group 7. He missed only one game, the opening against Wales in September 1994, but played the remaining nine, wearing the number 10 shirt, and scored two times. Rraklli is especially remembered among Albanian fans for his stupendous goal against Germany, a right-footed volley from the a tight angle that went in the left triangle of Andreas Köpke's goal. Even tho Albania lost the match 2–1 at Fritz-Walter-Stadion, the goal received notoriety in both Albania and Germany. It was yet another poor campaign by Albania, who achieved the last place jointly with Wales, who had better goal difference.

At 32 years old, Rraklli was snubbed by newly appointed manager Giuseppe Dossena for the opening UEFA Euro 2004 qualifying matches against Switzerland and Russia in October 2002. He, however, returned in March 2003 after being called up by team manager Hans-Peter Briegel, making his first qualifying appearance against Russia at Loro Boriçi Stadium, netting the opener inside 20 minutes in a subsequent 3–1 win; he became only the second ever Albania player to reach double-figures with the national team, the first being Sokol Kushta, who achieved the feat in 1995. It was also the official debut of manager Hans-Peter Briegel. At the time he also become all-time top goalscorer of Albania, with 10 goals.

Rraklli's final appearance took part on 30 March 2005 coincidentally against Greece, valid for the 2006 FIFA World Cup qualification. Unlike his debut, Rraklli didn't score, and entered as a second-half substitute, unable to prevent the 2–0 away loss. It was his 63rd appearance, which at that time placed him in second in the all-time appearance maker list, only behind goalkeeper Foto Strakosha (73). He played only two matches during the qualifying stage, both of them as substitute, as Albania concluded Group 2 in fifth position with 13 points, leaving behind Georgia and Kazakhstan.

Managerial career
Rraklli started working as a manager immediately after retiring, creating Tirana AS and going on to win the inaugural Albanian women's championship. In 2011, he was appointed at the helm of the women's national team since 2011.

In April 2016, Rraklli left his position due to family reasons. In December 2015, Rraklli was at the center of a controversy, as several players refused call-ups due to sexual harassment by the coach. The local media also released several messages of Rraklli asking for sexual favours to several girls in reward of being part of the team. Some of the players were Ambra Gjegji, Lucie Gjini, Ezmiralda Franja and Megi Doçi, who were not allowed to go to the national team by their family after the scandal became public.

Personal life
In November 2016, Rraklli was accused in match fixing in Austria. He was sentenced to ten months in prison, a sentence currently suspended.

In July 2017, the Prosecution of Tirana requested seven years imprisonment for Rraklli after being accused for fraud. Rraklli was accused of fraud for €150,000 towards an Albanian citizen, whose name is unknown, but it was alleged that it was his relative. The sentence was reduced to five years by the court, and later to three years and four months, due to Rraklli asking for shortened trial. Later, his sentence was converted into two years of test service.

Career statistics

Club

International

Scores and results list Albania's goal tally first, score column indicates score after each Rraklli goal.

Honours
Tirana
Albanian Superliga: 2004–05
Albanian Supercup: 2005

References

External links

1970 births
Living people
Footballers from Kavajë
Albanian footballers
Association football forwards
Albania international footballers
Besa Kavajë players
SC Freiburg players
Hertha BSC players
SpVgg Unterhaching players
Diyarbakırspor footballers
SSV Jahn Regensburg players
KF Tirana players
Kategoria Superiore players
Bundesliga players
2. Bundesliga players
Süper Lig players
Albanian expatriate footballers
Expatriate footballers in Germany
Expatriate footballers in Turkey
Albanian expatriate sportspeople in Germany
Albanian expatriate sportspeople in Turkey
Albanian football managers